Odisha State Highway 1 is a state highway in Odisha, India.

It connects Khordha to Damerikia via Begunia, Pichukuli, Bolagarh, Nayagarh, Sampada, Korada, Patapurpatana, Niliguda, Banigocha, Titirikada, Khajuripada, Phulbani, Teraguda, Sarangapada. It forms a part of National Highway 224, stretching to the village of Banigocha.

References

1